8J or 8-J can refer to:

8J, IATA code for UTair Express
8J, code for Greater Albany Public School District
8J powertrain, a feature of the Audi TT
F-8J, a model of  Vought F-8  Crusader
Y-8J, a model of Shaanxi Y-8
8J, shed code for Allerton TMD
8JE740, code for  J&J Hunt Submerged Archaeological Site

See also
J8 (disambiguation)